The Kivu climbing mouse (Dendromus nyasae) is a species of rodent in the family Nesomyidae.
It is found in Burundi, Democratic Republic of the Congo, Rwanda, Malawi, Tanzania, Uganda, and Zambia.
Its natural habitats are subtropical or tropical moist montane forests, subtropical or tropical high-altitude grassland, swamps, arable land, and plantations .

References

Musser, G. G. and M. D. Carleton. 2005. Superfamily Muroidea. pp. 894–1531 in Mammal Species of the World a Taxonomic and Geographic Reference. D. E. Wilson and D. M. Reeder eds. Johns Hopkins University Press, Baltimore.

Dendromus
Rodents of Africa
Mammals described in 1916
Taxa named by Oldfield Thomas
Taxonomy articles created by Polbot